Kevaughn St. Michael Atkinson (born 11 November 1995 in Jamaica) is a Jamaican footballer.

Career

As a youth player, Atkinson traveled with his brother, Jamaican international Leon Bailey, and adoptive father, Craig Butler, to Europe, where they played for the youth teams of Austrian club USK Anif as well K.R.C. Genk before he returned to Jamaica with Sporting Central Academy.

In 2016, he signed for Maltese side Mosta.

In 2017, Atkinson signed for St. Andrews in Malta.

For the second half of 2018/19, he was sent on loan to Slovakian top flight team FK Senica.

In 2019, he was sent on loan to SC Austria Lustenau in the Austrian second division, failing to make an appearance there.

In 2020, Atkinson returned to Malta with Senglea Athletic.

References

External links
 Kevaughn Atkinson at Soccerway

Jamaican footballers
Living people
Association football forwards
1995 births
St. Andrews F.C. players
FK Senica players